Bayton is a village and civil parish in the Malvern Hills District of Worcestershire, England. According to the 2001 census it had a population of 443. The Village Hall was built and decorated following years of hard work by dedicated local villagers. There is a church dedicated to St Bartholomew and within the Wyre Forest West group of parishes.

Bayton was in the lower division of Doddingtree Hundred.

References

External links

Villages in Worcestershire
Civil parishes in Worcestershire